Fornovo di Taro is a comune (municipality) in the province of Parma, in the Italian region Emilia-Romagna, located about  west of Bologna and about  southwest of Parma. The town lies on the east bank of the Taro River.

Fornovo di Taro borders the following municipalities: Collecchio, Medesano, Sala Baganza, Solignano, Terenzo, Varano de' Melegari. The Via Solferino bridge connects it to Ramiola on the other side of the river.

It is especially remembered as the seat of the Battle of Fornovo, fought in 1495 between the Italian league and the French troops of Charles VIII.

At the end of the Second World War, the commune was liberated from Nazi German and Italian fascist forces by Brazilian forces on 29 April 1945. The main church is Chiesa di Fornovo Taro. The town also houses the Romanesque architecture church of Santa Maria Assunta (9th-12th centuries).

Population:
There were 6.007 inhabitants on 01/01/2019.
On 1 January 2019 there were 948 foreigners resident in the municipality, constituting 16% of the population. 54% of them are from African countries, 35% are from European countries and 9% from Asian countries. Below are the largest groups:
 Morocco: 272,
 Albania: 132,
 Romania: 126,
 Ghana: 80,
 Tunisia: 66,
 Moldova: 46,
 India: 32,
 Nigeria: 28,
 Ivory coast: 25,
 Ukraine: 21

References

External links

 Official website

Cities and towns in Emilia-Romagna